Hedosyne  is a genus of plants in the family Asteraceae.

There is only one known species, Hedosyne ambrosiifolia, native to the southwestern United States and northern Mexico: Chihuahua, Coahuila, Durango, Nuevo León, San Luis Potosí, Sonora, Zacatecas, New Mexico, western Texas, southern Arizona. The species is sometimes referred to by the common name ragged marsh-elder.

References

Monotypic Asteraceae genera
Flora of the Southwestern United States
Flora of Northeastern Mexico
Heliantheae